There's a Road on the Right (Spanish: Hay un camino a la derecha) is a 1953 Spanish drama film directed by Francisco Rovira Beleta and starring Francisco Rabal, Julia Martínez and Carlos Otero.

Cast

References

Bibliography 
 D'Lugo, Marvin. Guide to the Cinema of Spain. Greenwood Publishing, 1997.

External links 
 

1953 drama films
Spanish drama films
1953 films
1950s Spanish-language films
Films directed by Francisco Rovira Beleta
Spanish black-and-white films
1950s Spanish films